The 44th Saturn Awards, presented by the Academy of Science Fiction, Fantasy and Horror Films and honoring the best in science fiction, fantasy, horror, and other genres belonging to genre fiction in film, television, home entertainment and local theatre from February 2017 to February 2018, were held on June 27, 2018 in Burbank, California, and hosted by Jonah Ray. Nominations were announced on March 15, 2018.

Black Panther led the nominations for film with fourteen, becoming the second most nominated film in the awards' history behind Star Wars: The Force Awakens (2015) with fifteen, as the former scored nominations in every category for eligibility (2019's Avengers: Endgame would also receive fourteen nominations the following ceremony, sharing Black Panthers nomination record as the second/third most nominated film in the awards' history). It was followed by Star Wars: The Last Jedi with thirteen nominations, and Blade Runner 2049 and The Shape of Water with nine nominations each. The Walking Dead led the nominations for television for the fourth year in a row with seven, followed by streaming newcomer Star Trek: Discovery and the limited series Twin Peaks: The Return with five each. Seven individuals earned two nominations each, including double writing nominations for Michael Green (for his work on Blade Runner 2049 and Logan, sharing the nods with other writers), and two acting nominations for both film and television for Danai Gurira (for her performances in Black Panther and The Walking Dead, winning the former).

For film, Black Panther won the most awards with five, including Best Comic-to-Motion Picture Release and Best Film Director (Ryan Coogler), followed by Star Wars: The Last Jedi with three and Coco with two. For television, Better Call Saul and Twin Peaks: The Return won the most awards with three each (ending The Walking Deads four-year long streak as the top-winning series), followed by Star Trek: Discovery and The Walking Dead with two each.

Other notable wins include Mark Hamill's record-tying third Best Actor in a Film win for Star Wars: The Last Jedi (thirty-four years after his second win for 1983's Return of the Jedi), making him the first person to have won three Saturn Awards for the same role in film (Robert Downey Jr. would tie this record the following year for 2019's Avengers: Endgame), and Tom Holland's second consecutive win for Best Performance by a Younger Actor in a Film for Spider-Man: Homecoming (2017), making him the first performer to win the category twice for the same role or to win it in two consecutive years; Holland won a third the following year for 2019's Spider-Man: Far From Home, surpassing his own record.

Winners and nominees

Film

Television

Programs

Acting

Home Entertainment

Local Stage Production

Special Achievement Awards
 Special Achievement Award – Don Mancini
 Producer's Showcase Award – Jason Blum
 Dan Curtis Legacy Award – Sarah Schechter
 Filmmaker's Showcase Award – Jake Kasdan
 President's Memorial Award – Guillermo del Toro

Multiple wins and nominations

Multiple wins

Film
The following films won multiple awards:

 5 wins: Black Panther
 3 wins: Star Wars: The Last Jedi
 2 wins: Coco

Television
The following television series won multiple awards:

 3 wins: Better Call Saul, Twin Peaks: The Return
 2 wins: Star Trek: Discovery, The Walking Dead

Multiple nominations

Film
The following films received multiple nominations:

 14 nominations: Black Panther
 13 nominations: Star Wars: The Last Jedi
 9 nominations: Blade Runner 2049, The Shape of Water
 6 nominations: Logan, Wonder Woman
 5 nominations: Get Out
 4 nominations: Beauty and the Beast, Guardians of the Galaxy Vol. 2, It, Spider-Man: Homecoming, War for the Planet of the Apes
 3 nominations: The Greatest Showman, Valerian and the City of a Thousand Planets, Wonder, Wonderstruck
 2 nominations: Brawl in Cell Block 99, Coco, Dunkirk, The Fate of the Furious, Hostiles, Kong: Skull Island, Thor: Ragnarok, Three Billboards Outside Ebbing, Missouri

Television
The following television series received multiple nominations:

 7 nominations: The Walking Dead
 5 nominations: Star Trek: Discovery, Twin Peaks: The Return
 4 nominations: American Horror Story: Cult, Game of Thrones, Riverdale
 3 nominations: American Gods, The Flash, The Librarians, The Orville, Outlander, Supergirl
 2 nominations: The Alienist, Ash vs Evil Dead, Better Call Saul, Black Mirror, The Defenders, Doctor Who, Electric Dreams, Fargo, Fear the Walking Dead, Gotham, The Punisher, The Strain, Stranger Things, The X-Files

References

External links
 Official Saturn Awards website

Saturn Awards ceremonies
2017 film awards
2018 film awards
2018 in California
2017 television awards
2018 television awards
2017 in American cinema
2018 in American cinema
2017 awards in the United States
2018 awards in the United States